Cosmopoda is a genus of moths belonging to the family Tortricidae.

Species
Cosmopoda aenopus Diakonoff, 1981
Cosmopoda molybdopa Diakonoff, 1981

See also
List of Tortricidae genera

References

External links
tortricidae.com

Tortricidae genera
Olethreutinae
Taxa named by Alexey Diakonoff